Pierre Rene Grondin,  (August 18, 1925 - January 17, 2006) was a Canadian cardiac surgeon who was one of the first doctors to perform a successful heart transplant. He was legendary in his surgical abilities and style and brought many innovations to the Montreal Heart Institute after his post-graduate training with pioneers Michael DeBakey and Denton Cooley in Houston, Texas.  He was one of a select few heart surgeons worldwide who participated in the development of open heart surgery using the heart-lung machine in the early 1960s. He performed the first Canadian heart transplantation at the Montreal Heart Institute in May, 1968 shortly after the first successful heart transplant in the world in December, 1967 in Cape Town, South Africa by Dr. Christiaan Barnard.

Education and career 
Grondin was awarded a Doctor of Medicine degree from the Université Laval in 1951, after which he went on to obtain a specialist’s certificate in cardiac surgery and a fellowship from the American College of Surgeons in San Francisco in 1960. He began his career as a surgeon at the Hôpital Ste-Marie de Trois-Rivières. In 1971, he joined the faculty of medicine of the Université de Montréal as clinical professor.  After nearly 15 years as head of its surgical division, Dr. Pierre Grondin left the Montreal Heart Institute in 1978 to occupy the same position as head of cardiothoracic surgery at St. Francis Hospital in Miami Beach, Florida. He would return to Canada in 1990 to start a cardiac surgery program at the Hotel-Dieu Hospital in Quebec City and in 1995, at the age of 70, retired.

Achievements and later life 
Dr. Grondin was one of the pioneers in cardiovascular and thoracic surgery in his locale. In collaboration with other surgeons, he organized the surgery department at the Montreal Heart Institute; he was the department's head from 1963 to 1975. During this time, he was appointed Honorary Professor of the Faculty of Medicine of Santo Domingo. He was also responsible for agreements between the Université de Montréal and its counterparts in Liège and Madrid. In the course of his career, he became the recipient of several prominent awards, including the Prix Lenègre from the Fondation Nativelle in France, and the Order of Canada medal. In May 1968, at the Montreal Heart Institute, he performed the first successful heart transplant in Canada.

To date, over 300 cardiac transplants have been performed at the Montreal Heart Institute (MHI). Through Grondin's leadership, the MHI built a surgical team that is now known worldwide for its expertise in cardiovascular pathology and its commitment to research and teaching.

Grondin died in Shawinigan, Quebec on January 17, 2006 of an esophageal rupture at the age of 80.  He is survived by his 5 children: Louis, Jean, Marie-Pierre, Bernard, and Michel.

See also 
 Christiaan Barnard

References

External links 
 Montreal Heart Institute

1925 births
2006 deaths
Université Laval alumni
Canadian cardiac surgeons
Officers of the Order of Canada
20th-century surgeons